Chuma is a location in the La Paz Department in Bolivia. It is the seat of the Chuma Municipality, the first municipal section of the Muñecas Province and of the province.

References 

 Instituto Nacional de Estadistica de Bolivia

Populated places in La Paz Department (Bolivia)